Leon E. Smith Jr. (born 30 May 1937, Great Bend, Kansas) was a member of the Idaho House of Representatives, having served from 1999 to 2013. Prior, he was mayor of Twin Falls and a prosecutor for Twin Falls County, Idaho.  He holds a bachelor's degree from Kansas State University, and a law degree from Washburn University.

He and his wife Jan are the parents of three children.

References
Leon Smith, Jr. at Ballotpedia
Leon Smith, Jr. at Project Vote Smart

1937 births
American prosecutors
Kansas State University alumni
Living people
Mayors of places in Idaho
Republican Party members of the Idaho House of Representatives
People from Great Bend, Kansas
People from Twin Falls, Idaho
Washburn University alumni